Goniotorna angusta is a species of moth of the family Tortricidae. It is found in Madagascar.

References

	

Moths described in 1960
Goniotorna